François Christophe Edmond de Kellermann, 3rd Duke of Valmy (1802-1868) was a distinguished statesman, political historian, and diplomat under the July Monarchy.

He was the son of François Étienne de Kellermann and the grandson of marshal François Christophe de Kellermann. Elected to the Chamber of Deputies in 1842, he retired from politics in 1848. With his death the title became extinct.

Work
De la force du droit et du droit de la force (1850) 
Histoire de la campagne de 1800 (1854, written using his father's papers) 
Le génie des peuples dans les arts (1867)

Notes

References

External links
 

1802 births
1868 deaths
19th-century French diplomats
Dukes of Valmy
French people of German descent
19th-century French writers
Burials at Père Lachaise Cemetery
French male writers
19th-century French male writers